Noah Bischof (born 7 December 2002) is an Austrian professional footballer who plays as a midfielder for Austrian Football Bundesliga club SC Rheindorf Altach.

Club career
Bischof began his career with SC Göfis. He moved to Rheindorf Altach in 2012, before joining the youth academy of AKA Vorarlberg in 2016, where he progressed through all age groups. In September 2020, he signed a professional contract with his parent club Rheindorf Altach. He joined their professional squad for the 2021–22 season, and made his Austrian Bundesliga debut on 24 July 2021, when he came off the bench for Atdhe Nuhiu in the 63rd minute on the first matchday of the season against LASK, which ended in a 1–0 home loss. He scored his first senior goal on 24 October 2021, the 1–0 winner against LASK from an assist by Nosa Iyobosa Edokpolor.

International career
Bischof received his first call-up to the under-21 squad for European Championship qualifiers against Croatia and Norway in March 2022, but did not make an appearance during the games. He made his under-21 debut on 17 November 2022 in a friendly against Turkey, replacing Christoph Lang after halftime.

Career statistics

References

External links
 Noah Bischof at SC Rheindorf Altach
 

2002 births
Living people
Austrian footballers
Austria under-21 international footballers
People from Feldkirch, Vorarlberg
Footballers from Vorarlberg
Association football midfielders
SC Rheindorf Altach players
Austrian Football Bundesliga players
Austrian Landesliga players
Austrian Regionalliga players